On 3 December 2020, at about 11:20 GMT, a silo containing biosolids exploded in Avonmouth, Bristol, UK, killing four men, including a 16-year old apprentice, and injuring another person. Avon and Somerset Police declared a major incident, and a doctor and specialist paramedic in critical care from the nearby Great Western Air Ambulance headquarters attended the incident by both their rapid response car and emergency helicopter.

The sewage treatment and food waste site is operated by GENeco, a subsidiary of Wessex Water. Its products include biomethane produced by anaerobic digestion, which is supplied to bus operators, among them Bristol Community Transport who operate one of the MetroBus routes.

Unconfirmed evidence obtained by The Bristol Cable suggests the men were using angle grinders on the top of a silo where methane could have accumulated, without adequate controls to prevent ignition. The official investigation remains in progress as of December 2021.

References 

Explosions in England
Explosions in 2020
2020 disasters in the United Kingdom
2020s in Bristol
Explosion
December 2020 events in the United Kingdom
Industrial fires and explosions in the United Kingdom